The province of Lucca is a province in the Tuscany region of Italy. Its capital is the city of Lucca.

There are 33 comuni (singular: comune) in the province.

Geography
Situated in northwestern coastal Italy, within Tuscany, Lucca borders the Ligurian Sea to the west, the provinces of Massa e Carrara to the northwest, Pisa to the south, Pistoia to the north-east and Firenze to the east. To the north it abuts the region of Emilia-Romagna (Provinces of Reggio Emilia and Province of Modena). Access to the Ligurian Sea is through municipalities such as Torre del Lago, Viareggio, and Forte dei Marmi. It is divided into four areas; Piana di Lucca, Versilia, Media Valle del Serchio and Garfagnana. Versilia is known for its extensive beaches, and there are coastal dunes and wetlands in the Migliarino-San Rossore-Massaciuccoli Natural Park. The principal resorts of the province are located at Viareggio, Lido di Camaiore, Pietrasanta and Forte dei Marmi. Garfagnana is known for its wooded hills and olive trees.

The lake was known in ancient times as the Fossis Papirianis, a name used in the Tabula Peutingeriana. The composer Giacomo Puccini lived nearby and frequently hunted around the lake; today the Puccini Festival is held there annually in celebration.
The springs of Bagni di Lucca, in valley of the Lima River, a tributary of the Serchio are known from the early history of Lucca as the Vicaria di Val di Lima, and Fallopius once claimed that the springs cured his own deafness.

Main sights 

Situated along the Via Francigena, a major Medieval pilgrimage route,  the province is dotted with castles, abbeys, parish churches and villas such as the Villa Torrigiani and Villa Mansi. Lucca Cathedral, also known as the Duomo of San Martino, was originally built in the 6th century, but was rebuilt in the 11th century in the Romanesque style, consecrated by Alexander II in 1070. It was restored again with Tuscan Gothic influences in the 14th century, when columns of the upper arches were added. The Church of San Frediano, also in the city Lucca, is reputed to be only example of Lombard architecture preserved without notable alteration, although the façade dates to about 1200. The church contains some valuable pieces of art, as does the Mansi Palace and the 14th-century Church of San Francesco, which contains the tomb of the Lucchese poet Giovanni Guidiccioni.

The Casa Guinigi and the Guinigi Tower of Lucca is a fine example of remaining medieval architecture in the province; construction began in 1384 to accommodate the wealthy Guinigi family. Paolo Guinigi was a ruler of the town a little later in the early 15th century.  high, it was built with sandstone and brick from Matraia and Verrucano from the Monti Pisani.  Only one of the original towers remains, and loggia and the porch on the ground floor of it have been shut off. 

Also of note is an Aqueduct of Nottolini consisting of 459 arches, constructed between 1823 and 1832.

Government

List of presidents of the province of Lucca

References

External links

Official website 

 
L
Lucca